The Flying Saucer is a 1950 independently made American black-and-white science fiction spy film drama. It was written by Howard Irving Young, from an original story by Mikel Conrad, who also produced, directed, and stars with Pat Garrison and Hantz von Teuffen. The film was first distributed in the U.S. by Film Classics and later re-released in 1953 by Realart Pictures, on a double-bill with Atomic Monster (the retitled-reissue of Man Made Monster, originally released in 1941 by Universal Pictures).

The Flying Saucer is the first feature film to deal with the (then) new and hot topic of flying saucers. Flying saucers, or alien craft shaped like flying disks or saucers, were first identified and given the popular name on June 24, 1947, when private pilot Kenneth Arnold reported nine silvery, crescent-shaped objects flying in tight formation. A newspaper reporter coined the snappy tagline, "flying saucers", which captured the public's imagination.  During the 1947 flying disc craze, over 800 'copycat' sightings were reported throughout North America.

The film has no relationship and should not be confused with the later Ray Harryhausen science fiction film Earth vs. the Flying Saucers, released by Columbia Pictures.

Plot
American Intelligence officials learn that Soviet spies have begun exploring a remote region of the Alaskan Territory in search of answers to the worldwide reports of "flying saucers". A wealthy American playboy, Mike Trent (Mikel Conrad), who was raised in that remote region, is recruited by intelligence officer Hank Thorn (Russell Hicks) to assist a Secret Service agent in exploring that area to discover what the Soviets may have found.

To his pleasant surprise, Mike discovers the agent is an attractive woman named Vee Langley (Pat Garrison). They set off together and slowly become mutually attracted to each other. Their cover story is that Mike is suffering from a nervous breakdown and she is his private nurse. At Mike's family's wilderness lodge, they are met by a foreign-accented caretaker named Hans (Hantz von Teuffen), new to the job.

Mike is very skeptical of the flying saucer reports until he spots one flying over the lodge. Assorted complications ensue until Mike and Vee finally discover that Hans is one of the Soviet agents who is trying to acquire the flying saucer. It turns out that the saucer is an invention of American scientist Dr. Lawton (Roy Engel). But Turner (Denver Pyle), Lawton's assistant, is a communist sympathizer and has other ideas: he tries to make a deal to sell the saucer to the Soviets for one million dollars.

Mike's trip to Juneau to see old friends, including Matt Mitchell (Frank Darrien), is ill-advised. When Vee tracks him down, he is in the company of a bar girl, named Nanette (Virginia Hewitt). Matt gets mixed up with the Soviet agents who are trying to obtain control of the saucer. When he tries to strike a bargain with ring leader Colonel Marikoff (Lester Sharpe), at the spy's headquarters, Matt is knocked unconscious.

He is able to escape and seeks out Mike, but they are attacked by the Soviets, who kill Matt. Before he dies, however, Matt reveals the location of the saucer: Twin Lakes. Mike rents an aircraft and flies to where the saucer is hidden at an isolated cabin. After flying back to his lodge, he tries to find Vee, who has tried to spirit Lawton away. The trio are captured by the turncoat Taylor and a group of Soviet agents. The Soviets lead their prisoners through a secret tunnel hidden under the glacier. An avalanche begins and wipes them out. Mike, Vee, and Lawton escape the tunnel just in time to see Turner fly off in the saucer. It suddenly explodes in mid-air, due to a time bomb that Lawton  had planted on board for such an eventuality. Their mission now accomplished, Mike and Vee embrace and kiss.

Cast
 Mikel Conrad as Mike Trent
 Pat Garrison as Vee Langley
 Hantz von Teuffen as Hans
 Roy Engel as Dr. Lawton
 Lester Sharpe as Col. Marikoff
 Denver Pyle as Turner, a spy
 Earl Lyon as Alex, a spy
 Frank Darrien as Matt Mitchell
 Russell Hicks as Intelligence Chief Hank Thorn
 Virginia Hewitt as Nanette, bar girl
 Garry Owen as Bartender

Production
Principal photography for The Flying Saucer took place from late September to early October 1949 at Hal Roach Studios. Additional B-roll photography was shot in Alaska on location where, according to a September 21, 1949 article in the Los Angeles Examiner, Mikel Conrad claimed to have obtained footage of actual flying saucers while shooting Arctic Manhunt in Alaska in the winter of 1947.

The opening prologue appears before the onscreen credits and states: "We gratefully acknowledge the cooperation of those in authority who made the release of the 'Flying Saucer' film possible at this time." The message obliquely alluded to some authorized government films of flying saucers. None of that footage was actually included in The Flying Saucer.

Reception
The Flying Saucer did not rise above its B film origins. Its low budget production doomed it to the bottom end of theater playbills and drive-ins. The New York Times film critic Bosley Crowther observed: "A film called 'The Flying Saucer' flew into the Rialto yesterday and, except for some nice Alaskan scenery, it can go right on flying, for all we care. In fact, it is such a clumsy item that we doubt if it will go very far, and we hesitate, out of mercy, to fire even a critical shot at it".

Copyright
All rights to The Flying Saucer have been owned worldwide since 1977 by Wade Williams. Copyright was renewed on November 29, 1977 (R 677308), Library of Congress Copyright Office.

See also

 1950 in film
 List of science fiction films of the 1950s

References

Notes

Bibliography

 Strick, Philip. Science Fiction Movies. London: Octopus Books Limited, 1976. .
 Warren, Bill. Keep Watching the Skies: American Science Fiction Films of the Fifties, 21st Century Edition. Jefferson, North Carolina: McFarland & Company, 2009. .

External links
 
 The Flying Saucer at IMDB
 
 Trailer for The Flying Saucer at Internet Archive

1950 films
American science fiction films
1950s science fiction films
American spy films
Cold War spy films
UFO-related films
1950s English-language films
Film Classics films
American black-and-white films
Avalanches in film
Films set in Alaska
Films shot in Alaska
1950s American films